This is a list of Pakistani One-day International cricketers. A One Day International, or an ODI, is an international cricket match between two representative teams, each having ODI status, as determined by the International Cricket Council (ICC). An ODI differs from Test matches in that the number of overs per team is limited, and that each team has only one innings. The list is arranged in the order in which each player won his first ODI cap. Where more than one player won his first ODI cap in the same match, those players are listed alphabetically.

ODI cricketers
Statistics are correct as at 13 January 2023

Notes:
1 Abdul Razzaq, Inzamam-ul-Haq, Shahid Afridi, Shoaib Akhtar, Mohammad Yousuf and Mohammad Asif also played ODI cricket for ACC Asian XI. Only their records for Pakistan are given above. 
2 Mohammad Yousuf was known as Yousuf Youhana until 2005.

See also
One Day International
Pakistani cricket team
List of Pakistan Test cricketers
List of Pakistan Twenty20 International cricketers

References

reord
Pakistan
ODI